A mid vowel (or a true-mid vowel) is any in a class of vowel sounds used in some spoken languages. The defining characteristic of a mid vowel is that the tongue is positioned midway between an open vowel and a close vowel.

Other names for a mid vowel are lowered close-mid vowel and raised open-mid vowel, though the former phrase may also be used to describe a vowel that is as low as open-mid; likewise, the latter phrase may also be used to describe a vowel that is as high as close-mid.

Vowels
The only mid vowel with a dedicated symbol in the International Phonetic Alphabet is the mid central vowel with ambiguous rounding .

Thus a true mid front unrounded vowel can be transcribed as either a lowered  (with a lowering diacritic) or as a raised  (with a raising diacritic). Typical truly mid vowels are thus:

 mid front unrounded vowel  or 
 mid front rounded vowel  or 
 mid central compressed vowel 
 mid back unrounded vowel  or 
 mid back rounded vowel  or

Languages
Few languages contrast all three heights of mid vowel, because it is rare for a language to distinguish more than four heights of true front or back vowels.

The Kensiu language spoken in Malaysia and Thailand is highly unusual in that it phonemically contrasts true-mid vowels with close-mid and open-mid vowels without differences in other parameters such as backness or roundedness.

Vowels by height